Capulomala is an extinct genus of stereospondyl temnospondyl known from the Early Triassic. Separate species are recognised, C. panchetensis found in the Panchet Formation of India and C. arcadiaensis from the Arcadia Formation of Australia.

Description
Capulomala is described on the basis of postglenoid areas of the mandible, which possess a uniquely hypertrophied postglenoid process. Capulomala cannot be reliably associated with any known cranial material.

References 

Induan life
Olenekian life
Triassic temnospondyls of Asia
Triassic India
Fossils of India
Triassic temnospondyls of Australia
Paleontology in Queensland
Fossil taxa described in 2009